Mikyashevo (Mäkäş) is a rural locality (a selo) and the administrative centre of Mikyashevsky Selsoviet, Davlekanovsky District, Bashkortostan, Russia. The population was 782 as of 2010. There are 6 streets.

Geography 
Mikyashevo is located 29 km west of Davlekanovo (the district's administrative centre) by road. Kuryatmasovo is the nearest rural locality.

References 

Rural localities in Davlekanovsky District